Leptostales laevitaria, the raspberry wave moth, is a species of moth in the family Geometridae (the geometer moths). It was first described by Geyer in 1837 and it is found in North America.

The MONA or Hodges number for Leptostales laevitaria is 7177.

References

Further reading

 
 
 
 
 
 
 
 
 
 

Sterrhinae
Articles created by Qbugbot
Moths described in 1837